Rai Raya Rai Venkata Rao (born T. Venkata Rao, also spelt Venkatta Row; died 1843), was an Indian administrator and statesman who served as Diwan of Travancore 18211829 and 183839. He was the father of R. Raghunatha Rao, brother of R. Ranga Rao and paternal uncle of Sir T. Madhava Rao.

Early life 

He was born in Coombaconum in the Thanjavur Maratha Kingdom to Gundopanth Kumbhakoni in a Thanjavur Marathi Deshastha Madhva Brahmin family. He was educated in the Madras Presidency and on completion of his education, joined the service of the British.

Public life 

Venkata Rao served as the Head Sheristadar to the Chief Commissioner of Mysore 183438 and as Assistant Chief Commissioner of Mysore 184042. In 1842, he was appointed Diwan of Hyderabad and served till 1843, when he returned to Bangalore due to ill-health.

Diwan of Travancore 

In 1819, Venkata Rao joined the Travancore state service as an assistant to Colonel McDowall, the British resident. He impressed the Queen-regent of Travancore by his abilities, and was soon appointed Diwan Peishkar or Governor of one of the divisions of the Travancore kingdom. During his tenure as Diwan Peishkar, Venkata Rao repaired and refurbished the Padmanabhaswamy Temple in Trivandrum and modified the dress codes of the sepoys.

In 1821, the Diwan, Reddy Row, accepted a jagir of two villages from the queen; the resulting scandal forced him to resign. Venkata Rao who was related to Reddy Row was selected to replace him, with the support of the British resident.

On taking office, Venkata Rao immediately waived taxes. He set up his base at Quilon and organised a number of irrigation works. The Kadinangulam backwaters were created during his tenure.

Honours 

Venkata Rao was given the title "Rai Raaya Rai" in 1838 in recognition of his services to the Crown.

References 

 

1843 deaths
Diwans of Travancore
People from Thanjavur district
Year of birth missing